Wych Street was in London where King, Melbourne and Australia Houses now stand on Aldwych. It ran west from the church of St Clement Danes on the Strand to meet the southern end of Drury Lane. It was demolished by the London County Council in around 1901, as part of redevelopment bisected by new street Aldwych, the east of which mimics its course, in a curved way so taking up land buildings stood on, and these works created Kingsway.

History

The area around Drury Lane was not affected by the Great Fire of London, and contained decrepit Elizabethan houses, with projecting wooden jetties. The Angel Inn public house was at the bottom of the street, by the Strand.  Further west, about halfway along on the north side, was the New Inn, an Inn of Chancery where Sir Thomas More received his early legal education, and, to the south, Lyon's Inn, another Inn of Chancery where Sir Edward Coke was a reader in 1578, which was replaced by a Globe Theatre and the Opera Comique . The Shakespeare's Head was the meeting place of the Club of Owls, named because of the late hours kept by its members. Mark Lemon, editor of Punch, lived there for a year and "a club of literati used to meet on the first floor".

In Literary Anecdotes John Nichols listed members of the monthly dining club that met at the Shakespeare's Head tavern: James Robson, Alderman Cadell, James Dodsley, Lockyer Davis, Thomas Longman, Peter Elmsly, honest Tom Payne of the Mews-gate, Thomas Evans of the Strand and Thomas Davies.

South of the western end was Drury House, the house of Sir Robert Drury, from which Drury Lane took its name, later rebuilt as Craven House by the first Lord Craven (died 1697), and finally turned into a public house, the "Queen of Bohemia", named after his unrequited love, Elizabeth of Bohemia, the daughter of James I.  This building was demolished – replaced by the first Olympic Theatre.

Jack Sheppard, the infamous thief, was apprenticed to a carpenter, Mr. Wood, on this street; one of his haunts, the White Lion tavern, was here.  The music hall performer Arthur Lloyd lived at № 39 in 1892.

Around 1780, the brothers George and John Jacob Astor, who became America's first multimillionaire, ran an instrument store in № 26.

In popular culture
Where Was Wych Street? is one of the best loved short stories by Stacy Aumonier (1877–1928).

In Patrick O'Brian's novel Post Captain (1972), the character Dr. Stephen Maturin is in London in late September 1804, reporting to the Admiralty in his capacity as a naval intelligence agent. Having left the Admiralty building on Whitehall, he intends to "wander[] among the bookstalls of Wych Street," but because of the rain he decides instead to return to his inn.

See also 
 List of demolished buildings and structures in London

References

External links
Where Was Wych Street? by Stacy Aumonier at Project Gutenberg.
 British Library:
Original watercolour of Wych Street, London, 1860 [from the author's presentation copy of The Life of Dickens, 1872-74]
Old Houses In Wych Street, 1876 Photographer: A. & J. Bool, Printer: Henry Dixon 
Old Houses In Wych Street, 1876 Photographer: A. & J. Bool, Printer: Henry Dixon
Wych Street, London, 1901
"The Strand (northern tributaries): Clement's Inn, New Inn, Lyon's Inn etc.", Old and New London: Volume 3 (1878), pp. 32–5.
Map

History of the City of Westminster
Streets in the City of Westminster
Former streets and roads of London